Raz Shirin (also Romanized as Raz Shīrīn and Raz-e Shīrīn; also known as Zar-e Shīrīn) is a village in Dalfard Rural District, Sarduiyeh District, Jiroft County, Kerman Province, Iran. At the 2006 census, its population was 116, in 30 families.

References 

Populated places in Jiroft County